Matucana District is one of thirty-two districts of the Huarochirí Province in Peru.

Geography 
Other mountains are listed below:

References